Eduardo López Villarreal (born 14 October 1994) is a former Mexican footballer who last played as a midfielder for Mineros de Zacatecas.

References

External links
 

1994 births
Living people
Mexican footballers
Association football midfielders
Sporting Canamy footballers
Mineros de Zacatecas players
Ascenso MX players
Liga Premier de México players
Tercera División de México players
Footballers from Zacatecas
People from Zacatecas City